The R434 road is a regional road in Ireland linking Borris-in-Ossory on the R445 to Durrow on the N77. En route it passes through Aghaboe and Ballycolla, and over both the M7 and M8 motorways. The entire route is within County Laois.

The R434 was the former Trunk Road, T48.

See also
Roads in Ireland
National primary road
National secondary road

References
Roads Act 1993 (Classification of Regional Roads) Order 2006 – Department of Transport

Regional roads in the Republic of Ireland
Roads in County Laois
Roads in County Kilkenny